Dom Fernando II of Braganza (1430 – 20 June 1483) was the 3rd Duke of Braganza and the 1st Duke of Guimarães, among other titles. He is known for being executed for treason against the King.

Early life 

Fernando II, born in 1430, was a successful young man and quickly grew popular amongst the Portuguese nobility. He was most appreciated by King Afonso V of Portugal, and always escorted the King on his different incursions into Morocco, where he participated in several conquests and expeditions. Being favored by King Afonso V, Fernando was created Count of Guimarães in 1464. He was soon upgraded to Duke of Guimarães in 1475.

Fernando II took part in the War of the Castilian Succession. Following King Henry IV of Castile's death, the King's daughter and heir, Joanna La Beltraneja, married to King Afonso V, was proclaimed "Queen of Castile", but she had the opposition of her half-aunt (the future queen Isabella I of Castile) to contend with. The Portuguese invaded Castile, and during the Battle of Toro, Fernando was responsible for Queen Joanna’s safety.

When his father, Fernando I, 2nd Duke of Braganza, died in 1478, Fernando II inherited the various titles of his father, the most important and noteworthy being the title of Duke of Braganza. At this time, the House of Braganza was the most powerful noble house in the Kingdom of Portugal (with its seat at Vila Viçosa) and one of the most powerful ones in all of the Iberian Kingdoms. During that period, the Dukes of Braganza resided at Vila Viçosa Castle.

Treason and downfall 
When King John II of Portugal succeeded his father, King Afonso V, he sought to bring down the power of the Portuguese nobility, which had greatly flourished under his father's reign. The King heavily focused on diminishing the powers of the two most powerful noble houses in the kingdom, House of Beja and Viseu and the House of Braganza.

King John II accused his first cousin, Diogo I of Beja and Viseu (brother-in-law of Fernando II), of high treason and had him brutally executed. Soon after, the King also accused his second half-cousin, Fernando II of Braganza, of high treason and had him executed at Évora in 1483. Afterwards, the assets of the House of Braganza were confiscated and the family fled to Castile. The family returned in 1498 and had all their property returned.

Marriage and issue
Fernando II of Braganza married twice. His first marriage was to D. Leonor de Menezes; they had no issue. He later married Isabella of Viseu (daughter of Prince Ferdinand, Duke of Beja and Viseu, and sister of King Manuel I of Portugal) in 1472, with whom he had four children, though only two lived past infancy.

Ancestry

See also
Duke of Guimarães
List of Dukes of Braganza

Notes

Bibliography
”Nobreza de Portugal e do Brasil” – Vol. II, page 440/442. Published by Zairol Lda., Lisbon 1989.

External links

|-

1430 births
1483 deaths
Dukes of Braganza
101
House of Braganza
15th-century Portuguese people
Portuguese nobility